"Pop Goes the Weasel" is the best-selling single from hip hop trio 3rd Bass; it appears on their second album, Derelicts of Dialect (1991).

Released a year after the ill-fated Cactus Revisited E.P., "Pop Goes the Weasel" instantly became a hit and soon went gold. The song helped the album reach gold status a month later. The song's message was similar to "Gas Face", voicing criticism towards the many mainstream commercial rap artists that had been gaining attention in the early 1990s (such as Vanilla Ice and MC Hammer).

The song features funk samples from the J.B.'s and Stevie Wonder as well as rock samples of The Who's "Eminence Front", and the foundation sample was from Peter Gabriel's #1 hit, "Sledgehammer". Production came from John Gamble, Geeby Dajani, and Dante Ross (noted for their groundbreaking work on Brand Nubian and Grand Puba's debut albums).

The music video featured Henry Rollins as Vanilla Ice.

The song was listed as #70 on VH1's 100 Greatest Songs of Hip Hop.

Vanilla Ice answered back with a song called "The Wrath" in 1994.

The song was referenced in the movie The Nutty Professor while Sherman Klump's family sat around eating dinner.

Charts

References

1991 singles
3rd Bass songs
Songs written by Peter Gabriel
Songs written by Stevie Wonder